Senator Leonard may refer to:

Bill Leonard (politician) (born 1947), California State Senate
George Leonard (Congressman) (1729–1819), Massachusetts State Senate
Jerris Leonard (1931–2006), Wisconsin State Senate
Larry Leonard (1934–2002), Illinois State Senate
Randy Leonard (born 1952), Oregon State Senate
Timothy D. Leonard (born 1940), Oklahoma State Senate

See also
James B. Leonardo (1889–1962), Illinois State Senate